Marshal Manengkei (9 March 1949 – 25 August 2017) was a Dutch-Indonesian producer, songwriter, composer and lyricist. He is also an occasional singer. He has been the co-composer on a number of Dutch and European hit singles during the 1970s.

Background

Early years
He was born on March 9, 1949, In Surabaya, Indonesia. Due to the political upheaval in Indonesia during the 1960s, his family left their country for Europe in 1965. Some nine months after their arrival, his father suffered a stroke and young Marshal had to help out by finding extra paid work.

Career
Some of the hit songs he has co-composed with Andres Holten include "Sausalito" and "My Love" for Rosy & Andres. He also composed Oscar Harris's hit "Song For The Children", and Debbie's "Angelino". As a producer, he has produced for the Blue Diamonds,

Discography
 Stoney's Aphrodite – "Down At Rockszana's" / "Reaching Out" - Sky SKY 4159 SS - (1984)

References

1949 births
20th-century Indonesian male singers
Indonesian composers
Indonesian record producers
2017 deaths
Indonesian people of Dutch descent
Dutch people of Indonesian descent